Malcolm Richard Booker (9 August 191515 July 1998) was an Australian public servant, diplomat, author and journalist.

He held diplomatic posts as an Ambassador in Thailand (1962–1963), Italy (1970–1974) and Yugoslavia (1974–1976). He was also Chargé d'Affaires in Myanmar from 1952 to 1953. After his diplomatic career he published several books and wrote regularly for The Canberra Times.

Life and career
As a young man, Booker served as private secretary to Billy Hughes, the former prime minister. He later became one of Hughes' biographers, publishing The Great Professional: A Study of W.M. Hughes in 1980.

While on posting to Manila as first secretary from 1950 to 1952, Booker met Roxana. The pair became engaged, celebrating their betrothal at a party on the peak in Hong Kong.

From 1952 to 1953, Booker was Chargé d'Affaires in Burma, responsible for establishing the legation. He returned to Canberra in April 1953.

In 1962, Booker was appointed Australian Ambassador to Thailand. When he returned to Canberra in 1963, Booker was appointed Deputy Head of the Department of Territories. He soon returned to the external affairs department, taking a position as first assistant secretary, Level 3.

Booker was Australian Ambassador to Italy from 1970 to 1974.
In March 1974 Booker was appointed the Australian Ambassador to Yugoslavia, with simultaneous appointments as the non-resident Ambassador to Romania and Bulgaria.

Booker's book The Last Domino was published in 1976. The book was critical of several previous Australian foreign affairs ministers and the 1975 Whitlam dismissal.

Booker died on 15 July 1998.

Works

References

Further reading
Chad J. Mitcham, 'Booker, Malcolm Richard (1915–1998)', Australian Dictionary of Biography, National Centre of Biography, Australian National University, https://adb.anu.edu.au/biography/booker-malcolm-richard-31923/text39378, published online 2022.

1915 births
1998 deaths
Australian public servants
Ambassadors of Australia to Italy
Ambassadors of Australia to Thailand
Ambassadors of Australia to Yugoslavia
20th-century Australian journalists